The four senses of Scripture is a four-level method of interpreting the Bible. This method originated in Judaism and was taken up in Christianity by the Church Fathers.

In Kabbalah the four meanings of the biblical texts are literal, allusive, allegorical, and mystical. In Christianity, the four senses are literal, allegorical, tropological and anagogical.

History

Judaism 
In Judaism, bible hermeneutics notably uses midrash, a Jewish method of interpreting the Hebrew Bible and the rules which structure the Jewish laws.

Late Antiquity
The early allegorizing trait in the interpretation of the Hebrew Bible figures prominently in the massive oeuvre of a prominent Hellenized Jew of Alexandria, Philo Judaeus (c. 20 BC – c. 50 AD), whose allegorical reading of the Septuagint synthesized the traditional Jewish narratives with Platonism. Philo's allegorizing, in which he continued an earlier tradition, had little effect on later Jewish thought, in part because the Jewish culture of Alexandria dispersed by the fourth century.

In the 3rd century, the theologian Origen, a graduate of Catechetical School of Alexandria, formulated the principle of the three senses of Scripture (literal, moral, and spiritual) from the Jewish method of interpretation used by Paul of Tarsus in Epistle to the Galatians chapter 4. In the 4th century, the theologian Augustine of Hippo developed this doctrine which became the four senses of Scripture.

Prudentius wrote the first surviving Christian purely allegorical freestanding work, Psychomachia ("Soul-War"), about AD 400. The plot consists of the personified "good" virtues of Hope, Sobriety, Chastity, Humility, etc. fighting the personified "evil" vices of Pride, Wrath, Paganism, Avarice, etc. The personifications are women, because in Latin words for abstract concepts have feminine grammatical gender; an uninformed reader of the work might take the story literally as a tale of many angry women fighting one another because Prudentius provides no context or explanation of the allegory.

In this same period of the early 5th century, three other authors of importance to the history of allegory emerged: Claudian, Macrobius, and Martianus Capella. Little is known of these authors, even if they were "truly" Christian or not. Still, we know they handed down the inclination to express learned material in allegorical form, mainly through personification, which later became a standard part of medieval schooling methods.

Claudian's first work In Rufinum attacked the ruthless Rufinus and would become a model for the 12th century Anticlaudianus, a well-known allegory for how to be an upstanding man. As well his Rape of Proserpine served up a litany of mythological allegories, personifications, and cosmological allegories.

Neoplatonist commentators used allegory as a rhetorical, philosophical and religious devise in reading Ancient mythology, Homer, and Plato.

Macrobius wrote Commentary of the Dream of Scipio, providing the Middle Ages with the tradition of a favorite topic, the allegorical treatment of dreams.

Lastly, Martianus Capella wrote De nuptiis Philologiae et Mercurii ("Marriage of Philology and Mercury"), the title referring to the allegorical union of intelligent learning with the love of letters. It contained short treatises on the "seven liberal arts" (grammar, rhetoric, dialectic, geometry, arithmetic, astronomy, music) and thus became a standard textbook, greatly influencing educators and students throughout the Middle Ages.

Boethius, perhaps the most influential author of Late Antiquity, first introduced readers of his work Consolation of Philosophy to the personified Lady Philosophy, the source of innumerable later personified figures (such as Lady Luck, Lady Fortune, etc.)

Early Middle Ages
After Boethius, there exists no known work of allegorical literature until the 12th century. Although allegorical thinking, elements, and artwork abound during this period, it was not until the rise of the medieval university in the High Middle Ages that sustained allegorical literature appeared again.

High and Late Middle Ages
The earliest works were by Hugh of St Victor (Didascalicon, 1125), Bernard Silvestris (Cosmographia, 1147), and Alanus ab Insulis (Plaint of Nature, 1170, and Anticlaudianus) who pioneered the use of allegory (mainly personification) for abstract speculation on metaphysics and scientific questions.

The High and Late Middle Ages saw many allegorical works and techniques. There were four great works from this period.
 The Four Great Medieval Allegories
Le Roman de la Rose. A major allegorical work, it had many lasting influences on western literature, creating entire new genres and developing vernacular languages.
The Divine Comedy. Ranked amongst the greatest medieval works, both allegorically and as a work of literature; was (and remains) hugely popular.
Piers Plowman. An encyclopedic array of allegorical devices. Dream-vision; pilgrimage; personification; satire; typological story structure (the dreamer's progress mirrors the progress of biblical history from the Fall of Adam to the Apocalypse).
Pearl. In a plot based on an anagogical, allegory; a dreamer is introduced to heavenly Jerusalem. Focus on the meaning of death. A religious response to Consolation of Philosophy.

Four types of interpretation 

For most medieval thinkers there were four categories of interpretation (or meaning) used in the Middle Ages, which had originated with the Bible commentators of the early Christian era.

 The first is simply the literal interpretation of the events of the story for historical purposes with no underlying meaning. 
 The second is called typological: it connects the events of the Old Testament with the New Testament; in particular drawing allegorical connections between the events of Christ's life with the stories of the Old Testament. 
 The third is moral (or tropological), which is how one should act in the present, the "moral of the story". 
 The fourth type of interpretation is anagogical, dealing with the future events of Christian history, heaven, hell, the last judgment; it deals with prophecies.

Thus the four types of interpretation (or meaning) deal with past events (literal), the connection of past events with the present (typology), present events (moral), and the future (anagogical).

Dante describes interpreting through a "four-fold method" (or "allegory of the theologians") in his epistle to Can Grande Della Scala. He says the "senses" of his work are not simple, but:

The classic summary of fourfold exegesis is the following Latin doggerel verse, a widely known mnemonic device in medieval schools:

Old and New Testaments 

Medieval allegory began as a Christian method for synthesizing the discrepancies between the Old Testament and the New Testament. While both testaments were studied and seen as equally divinely inspired by God, the Old Testament contained discontinuities for Christians—for example the Jewish kosher laws. The Old Testament was therefore seen in relation to how it would predict the events of the New Testament, in particular how the events of the Old Testament related to the events of Christ's life. The events of the Old Testament were seen as part of the story, with the events of Christ's life bringing these stories to a full conclusion. The technical name for seeing the New Testament in the Old is called typology.

One example of typology is the story of Jonah and the whale from the Old Testament. Medieval allegorical interpretation of this story is that it prefigures Christ's burial, with the stomach of the whale as Christ's tomb. Jonah was eventually freed from the whale after three days, so did Christ rise from his tomb after three days. Thus, whenever one finds an allusion to Jonah in Medieval art or literature, it is usually an allegory for the burial and resurrection of Christ.

Another common typological allegory is with the four major Old Testament prophets Isaiah, Jeremiah, Ezekiel, and Daniel. These four prophets prefigure the four Apostles Matthew, Mark, Luke, and John. There was no end to the number of analogies that commentators could find between stories of the Old Testament and the New.

There also existed a tradition in the Middle Ages of mythography—the allegorical interpretation of pagan myths. Virgil's Aeneid and Ovid's Metamorphoses were standard textbooks throughout the Middle Ages, and each had a long tradition of allegorical interpretation. 
"An illustrative example can be found in Siena in a painting of Christ on the cross (Sano di Pietro's Crucifix, 15th c). At the top of the cross can be seen a bird pecking its own breast, blood pouring forth from the wound and feeding its waiting chicks below. This is the pelican whose "story" was told by the Roman naturalist Pliny the Elder. Thus by analogy to a "pagan" source,  Christ feeds his own children with his own blood."

Medieval philosophers also saw allegory in the natural world, interpreting animals, plants, and even non-living things in books called bestiaries as symbols of Biblical figures and morals.  For example, one bestiary compares stags with people devoted to the Church, because (according to medieval zoology) they leave their pastures for other (heavenly) pastures, and when they come to broad rivers (sin) they form in line and each rests its head on the haunches of the next (supporting each other by example and good works), speeding across the waters together.

See also
Allegory in Renaissance literature
Allegorical interpretations of Plato
Pardes (Jewish exegesis)
Rauðúlfs þáttr

Notes

References
Stephen A. Barney (1989). "Allegory". Dictionary of the Middle Ages. vol-1. 
William R. Cook and Ronald B. Herzman (2001). "Discovering the Middle Ages". The Teaching Company. 
Sylvia Huot. Allegorical Play in the Old French Motet. Stanford, 1997.
Conrad Rudolph,  "The Architectural Metaphor in Western Medieval Artistic Culture: From the Cornerstone to The Mystic Ark," The Cambridge History of Religious Architecture, ed. Stephen Murray (2016)
Conrad Rudolph,  "Building the House of God: Architectural Metaphor and The Mystic Ark," Codex Aquilarensis: Revista de arte medieval (2016)

Allegory
Biblical exegesis
Medieval literature